The Wave may refer to:

Arts, entertainment and media

Film and television 
 The Wave (1981 film), a TV movie based on The Third Wave social experiment
 The Wave (2008 film) (Die Welle), a German film, also based on The Third Wave social experiment
 The Wave (2015 film) (Bølgen), a Norwegian film
 The Wave (2019 film), an American film starring Justin Long
 The Wave (2018 TV series), a British game show
 Redes (film), a 1936 Mexican film known in English as The Wave

Literature and writing
 The Wave (novel), by Todd Strasser, based on the 1981 film
 The Wave, a novel by Lochlan Bloom
 Wave of Long Island, a New York newspaper
 The Delaware Wave, a newspaper
 The Wave, San Francisco magazine where A Deal in Wheat was first published

Music 
 The Wave (album), by Tom Chaplin, 2016, and a song from the album
 The Wave (R3hab album), 2018
 "The Wave" (Sneakbo song), 2011
 "The Wave" (Miike Snow song), 2012
 "The Wave", a song by Blake Shelton from the 2017 album Texoma Shore
 "The Wave", a 2018 single by Lion Babe

Radio stations 
 The Wave 96.4 FM, Swansea, Wales, U.K.
 CHWV-FM, Saint John, New Brunswick, Canada
 CHKX-FM, Hamilton, Ontario, Canada
 CJLS-FM, Yarmouth, Nova Scotia, Canada
 CKWV-FM, Nanaimo, British Columbia, Canada
 KANS, Emporia, Kansas, U.S.
 KTWV, Los Angeles, U.S.
 WNWV, Cleveland, Ohio, U.S.
 The Wave, a German radio station owned by RTL Group

Newspapers
Wave of Long Island
Los Angeles Wave, a weekly newspaper in Los Angeles, California
The Wave, a weekly newspaper in Huntington Beach, California published by the Orange County Register

Visual arts
 The Wave (Courbet), several paintings between 1869 and 1870
 The Wave (Paul Gauguin), an 1888 painting 
 The Wave, an 1896 painting by William-Adolphe Bouguereau
 The Great Wave off Kanagawa, or The Wave, a 19th-century Japanese woodblock print by Hokusai

Other uses
 The Wave (audience), a stadium cheer in sports
 The Wave (company), a British artificial wave pool company
 The Wave (Gold Coast), a residential skyscraper in Australia
 The Wave (streetcar), Fort Lauderdale, Florida's planned streetcar line
 The Wave (Vejle), a residential building complex in Vejle, Denmark
 The Wave (Arizona), a sandstone formation
 The Wave, Coventry, an indoor waterpark in Coventry, UK
 The Wave Transit System, Mobile, Alabama, U.S.

See also
 
 Wave (disambiguation)
 Great Wave (disambiguation)
 The Waves, a 1931 novel by Virginia Woolf
 The Pearl and the Wave or The Wave and the Pearl, an 1862 painting by Paul-Jacques-Aimé Baudry
 We Are the Wave, a German web TV series, based on the novel The Wave